During the American Civil War, a parole camp was a place where Union or Confederate soldiers on parole could be kept by their own side, in a non-combat role. They could be restored to a combat role if some prisoners of war were traded to the other side. This would enable them to be returned to a combat role as an exchange for the newly freed prisoners of war. Conditions in the camps were unpleasant; the parolees refused to do guard duty or routine work, claiming that would violate their parole. Many escaped to go home.

History
An honor system was set up where each side would take care of housing its own soldiers who had been designated as being on parole, meaning they would not fight in combat unless they were formally exchanged. The Confederates did not set up parole camps; they let their men go home and expected them to return to duty once officially exchanged. Parole camps were set up by the Union Army for its own soldiers who had been captured by the Confederacy, and then released on the condition that they would honor the terms and conditions of their parole.

In 1862, a parole camp was established in Annapolis, Maryland, on the grounds of St. John's College, But this camp soon ran out of space, so two more were soon built in the local area. One was located in nearby Parole, Maryland, which is how the town got its name. The resulting influx of soldiers changed the nature of the town, since the soldiers were free to visit the local area as much as they might wish. Many soldiers disliked the camp and described it as dirty in their letters home. There were some occasional problems with disorderly conduct by some of the soldiers who were sent there. 

There was a short-lived parole camp in West Chester, Pennsylvania, known as Camp Elder. One paroled soldier, Warren H. Freeman, wrote to his father and said that the parolees in the camp were being guarded by inexperienced members of the Pennsylvania militia, all of whom were fairly lenient in their guard duties, presumably because they were guarding members of their own army.

See also
 Dix–Hill Cartel
 Parole
 Prisoner-of-war camp

Footnotes

Further reading
 Pickenpaugh, Roger. Captives in Blue: The Civil War Prisons of the Confederacy (2013) excerpt and text search ch 4 pp 57-73 covers US Army parole camps in the North 
Parole of Civil War Prisoners, civil war.com
Camp Parole, Annapolis, Maryland, pa-roots.com.
The American Civil War: 365 Days, from the Library of Congress, by Margaret Wagner, entry for October 6, Harry Abrams Inc., 2006. Listing for book at loc.gov.
Subject: NARA US Army Continental Commands, 1821-1920, From: Steven J. Coker (coker@geocities.com), Date: April 10, 1999. lists all parole camps.
On the Edge of Discovery: Civil War POWs near West Chester?!, Chester County Historical Society website, accessed 4/8/13.
Author recounts Camp Parole history on 150th anniversary, capitalgazette.com, August 10, 2012.
Researcher delves into how Annapolis' Parole area got its name. Book details history of camp for former Civil War prisoners returned to Union army. By Mary Gail Hare, The Baltimore Sun, July 26, 2012.
Pennsylvania / Historical Marker of Camp Elder

Military history of the American Civil War
Prisoners of war
Parole in the United States
Prisoner-of-war camps
Internment camps